Martynas Sajus (born 22 February 1996) is a Lithuanian basketball player for ONVO Büyükçekmece of the Turkish Basketball Super League (BSL).

Professional career
On 9 July 2014, Sajus signed a 3+2 contract with Žalgiris Kaunas and started to play for Zalgiris development team in the NKL. In first season, he averaged 5.4 points per game and 3.9 rebounds per game. In December 2015, because of injuries in the Žalgiris main team, he was registered for a LKL match against BC Dzūkija and made a debut by scoring 2 points. On 29 December 2015, he made his EuroLeague debut against Laboral Kutxa playing only 4 seconds.

On August 11, 2016, Sajus was loaned to Polpharma Starogard Gdański for the 2016–17 season. After a successful season in Poland, he was brought back by Žalgiris on August 12, 2017.

On July 3, 2018, Sajus parted ways with the team and signed with Wilki Morskie Szczecin of the PLK.

On June 6, 2020, he has signed with Baxi Manresa of the Liga ACB.

On June 25, 2021, he has signed with Medi Bayreuth of the Basketball Bundesliga.

On July 31, 2022, he has signed with Büyükçekmece of the Turkish Basketball Super League (BSL).

National team career 
Sajus won gold medal with the Lithuanian team during the 2017 Summer Universiade after defeating the United States' team 74–85 in the final.

References

External links
 Martynas Sajus at euroleague.net
 Martynas Sajus - PLK

1996 births
Living people
Basketball players at the 2014 Summer Youth Olympics
Bàsquet Manresa players
BC Žalgiris players
BC Žalgiris-2 players
Büyükçekmece Basketbol players
Centers (basketball)
Liga ACB players
Lithuanian men's basketball players
Medalists at the 2017 Summer Universiade
Medi Bayreuth players
Universiade gold medalists for Lithuania
Universiade medalists in basketball
Youth Olympic gold medalists for Lithuania